Tuva may refer to:

Political entities:
 Tuva Republic, a federal subject of Russia
 Tuvan People's Republic (People's Republic of Tannu Tuva, 1921–1944)
 Tuvan Autonomous Oblast (1944-1961)
 Tuvan Autonomous Soviet Socialist Republic (1961–1992)

People:
 Tuva Semmingsen, (b. 1975) Norwegian opera singer (mezzosoprano) (:no:Tuva Semmingsen)

Other:
Tuva Depression, a region in Siberia
Tuva River, a river in Fiji
Tuva Novotny, a Swedish actress and singer
Tuva or Bust!, a book by Ralph Leighton
Tuva Silver Vole, a rodent found in Russia and Mongolia
Tuvan throat singing, a form of overtone singing
Project Tuva, a project by Microsoft Research and Bill Gates designed to teach people about the core of physics